Uromyces proeminens var. poinsettiae is a plant pathogen infecting poinsettias.

References

External links
 Index Fungorum
 USDA ARS Fungal Database

Fungal plant pathogens and diseases
Ornamental plant pathogens and diseases
proeminens var. poinsettiae